The Forbes Chair of English Language is a chair at the University of Edinburgh. It is one of a number of chairs founded in the 1940s following a bequest by East India mechant and Edinburgh alumnus Daniel Mackintosh Forbes. Its original title was the Forbes Chair of English Language and General Linguistics, but with the creation of a separate chair of general linguistics in the 1960s the latter part of the title was dropped, incumbent Angus McIntosh continuing in the role.

List of Forbes Professors of English Language
 1948-1979: Angus McIntosh
 1979-1988: James Peter Thorne
 1990-2004: Charles Jones
 2005-2011: April McMahon
 2013-: Bettelou Los

References

Professorships at the University of Edinburgh
Professorships in English
Professorships in languages